Dmytro Alexandrovich Zavadsky (born 4 November 1988) is a Ukrainian badminton player. He competed for Ukraine at the 2012 Summer Olympics.

Achievements

BWF International Challenge/Series 
Men's singles

Men's doubles

Mixed doubles

  BWF International Challenge tournament
  BWF International Series tournament
  BWF Future Series tournament

References

External links 
 
 

1988 births
Living people
Sportspeople from Kharkiv
Ukrainian male badminton players
Badminton players at the 2012 Summer Olympics
Olympic badminton players of Ukraine
Badminton players at the 2015 European Games
European Games competitors for Ukraine